So Min-chol (born 29 October 1978) is a North Korean former footballer. He represented North Korea on at least eight occasions between 1998 and 2002, scoring three goals.

Career statistics

International

International goals
Scores and results list North Korea's goal tally first, score column indicates score after each North Korea goal.

References

1978 births
Living people
North Korean footballers
North Korea international footballers
Association football forwards
Footballers at the 1998 Asian Games
Asian Games competitors for North Korea